William Patrick Partridge (8 March 1874 – 26 July 1917) was an Irish trade unionist and revolutionary socialist. He was a prominent member of James Connolly's Irish Citizen Army, and fought in the Easter Rising in Dublin 1916. He later served as a Dublin City Councillor.

Early life
Partridge was born in Sligo in 1874; his family lived at 6 Chapel Street after first living in West Gardens. His father, Benjamin Partridge, was an English train driver who moved to Ireland for work, and his mother, Ellen Hall, was an  Irish Catholic. His older brother, Felix Partridge (1872–1957), became a noted playwright. The family moved after a short time and he was brought up in Ballaghaderreen, County Roscommon. He was apprenticed at 17 as a mechanical fitter with the Midland & Great Western Railway in Sligo. He was a keen writer from an early age and contributed stories and poems to a magazine called The Shamrock.

Trade union work
At age 22, he was transferred to the railways workshops at Broadstone (one source notes Inchicore) in Dublin and here he became involved in the union movement, joining the Amalgamated Society of Engineers. He was involved in the ASE led strikes in 1887 and 1902, making him a pioneer in the developing trade union movement in Ireland.

Partridge became an organiser of the Irish Transport and General Workers Union which had been founded in 1909. He worked closely with Jim Larkin in setting up branches of the union outside Dublin. He was based at the union's Emmet Hall in Inchicore. He was involved in Conradh na Gaeilge (the Gaelic League) and was treasurer of the Inchicore branch. He campaigned for improved housing, education and civic amenities for the working people of Inchicore and he was elected to Dublin City Council where he served as a Sinn Féin councillor. He formed a branch of the ITGWU in Tralee, Listowel and Fenit Harbour and Killarney.

During the Great Lockout of 1913, Partridge was one of the main leaders of the struggle. He attacked the hypocrisy of Catholic clergy in Dublin who sided with the bosses and condemned the ITGWU while doing nothing themselves to combat the causes of dire poverty in the city.

The Rising
Partridge was a member of the first Provisional Army Council of the Irish Citizen Army along with Larkin, P.T. Daly, Thomas Foran, Seán O'Casey and Francis Sheehy Skeffington. Connolly sent Partridge to Kerry to supervise the landing of the expected German arms shipment at Fenit. his objective was to use the Transport union members at Fenit Harbour to unload the arms ship Aud, in fact the German ship the SS Libau.

However, the ship was scuttled by the captain Karl Spindler after the planned rendezvous with Roger Casement to unload the arms did not happen and they were then intercepted by the British Navy. After returning to Dublin, Partridge stood as officer of the guard at Liberty Hall as the proclamation of 1916 was being printed the night before the Rising. Partridge fought in the College of Surgeons with Countess Markievicz and Michael Mallin during Easter Week. During the fighting, he carried the wounded female sniper Margaret Skinnider on his back from Harcourt Street corner to the college while under constant fire.

Death
He was sentenced to 15 years of penal servitude, ironically, not for his part in the Rising, but for his actions in Kerry where he was charged with making anti-war speeches in 1915. These were deemed to be the more serious crime, presumably as they left him open to a charge of treason. He was released from prison in April 1917 as his health had seriously deteriorated. He apparently suffered from Bright's disease.

On 26 July 1917, he died in Ballaghaderreen, aged 43. He is buried in Kilcolman Cemetery. Countess Markievicz gave the oration at his graveside where she fired a salute over the grave with her own pistol. She described him as the "purest-souled and noblest patriot Ireland ever had".

References

Further reading
 Hugh Geraghty, William Patrick Partridge, Curlew Books (2003). , 9780954605506.

External links

1874 births
1917 deaths
Early Sinn Féin politicians
Irish Citizen Army members
Irish people of English descent
Irish rebels
Irish revolutionaries
Irish trade unionists
People from County Roscommon
People from Sligo (town)
People of the Easter Rising